The Korava were one of the tribes of the Madras Presidency during the British Raj in India. They were primarily involved in the salt trade, Gross boom trade, Gross backet trade. The tribes are used as Home Guard in several region. Later they  Were deported for Tea garden labour work in several countries like Sri Lanka, Reunion, Mauritius. In 1913 they were classed as a criminal tribe by the British authorities. Today there are an estimated 1.2 million (12 lakh) Korava in Tamil Nadu. Mainly this tribe was found in Madurai, Sivagangai, Theni, Ramanathapuram, Thanjavur, Nagapattinam, Tiruvarur, Tiruchirapalli, Salem, Namakkal, Karur, Perambalur and Pudukottai Districts of Tamil Nadu and Tiruvanantpuram, Kollam, Pathanamthitta, Palakkad, Idukki in Kerala.

Ethnonym
People of this community are called with different names in different parts of South India. They are called Yerukula in Andhra Pradesh (derived from the tradition of fortune telling by the women), Korama, Korachas in Karnataka, Kaikadi in Maharashtra, and Sidanar in Kerala. The  among all these communities is the same, i.e. Kavadi, Sathupadi, Maanupadi and Mendraguthi. They are also known as Malai Kuruvans, Kuravans, Thalaiyaris, Kavalkara Koravars, Uppu Koravars, Dabi Koravars (Simbu Koravars), Gandarvakottai Koravars, Inji Koravas, Koravas, Kalinji Dabikoravas, Kala Koravas, Monda Koravas, Karuvapillai Koravas, Thogamalai Koravas, Mel Nadu and Kel Nadu Koravas, Kathukuthi Koravas, Pachai kuthi Koravas, Sidanars, Panikers, Vedars, and Vettuvars.

Caste politics
In 2006 the Koravar applied to gain Scheduled Tribe status.

Recently many Koravar activists have protested the Tamil-language film Paruthiveeran on the grounds that it demeans their culture and even more specifically their women. For further reference see "The encyclopaedia of Dravidian tribes"- Volume 3 about Konanki Kuravar, Bommayya Kuravar, Nanchil Kuravar of Nagercoil region of Tamil Nadu.

Sources
Dishonored by History, p. 27

Scheduled Tribes of India
Social groups of Tamil Nadu
Social groups of Puducherry